Janis Louise Cocking  is a retired Australian metallurgist. Her last post before retirement was as Chief Science Strategy and Program at Defence Science and Technology Group, a branch of the Department of Defence. She retired on 25 July 2018.

Career

Cocking completed her degree in metallurgy at the University of Melbourne and started work for Defence Science and Technology Organisation, initially in high-temperature alloys to develop a thermocouple for measuring high temperatures, to extend the life of turbine blades at the hot end of Royal Australian Air Force jet engines.

Cocking was appointed as visiting scientist at the United States Naval Research Laboratory.

On her return to Australia, Cocking worked on submarine and air independent propulsion systems, and coordinated a team working to remedy design issues with the Collins-class submarines and has been Research Leader Undersea Platform Systems, DSTO Submarine Science and Technology Co-ordinator, Director of the Maritime Program Office and Chief of Maritime Division before her current role as Chief of Science Strategy and Program Division. She was involved in development of Collins-class submarines, and in the requirements and design for the Collins-class submarine replacement project. She has also been a member of the board of the Australian Maritime College.

Cocking was awarded a Doctor of Engineering honoris causa by the University of Tasmania on 23 August 2014. 

Cocking was awarded a Public Service Medal in the 2018 Queen's Birthday Honours (Australia) for her service to Defence science and technology. She has also been elected as a Fellow of the Australian Academy of Technological Sciences and Engineering.

References

Australian metallurgists
Australian women scientists
Fellows of the Australian Academy of Technological Sciences and Engineering
Recipients of the Public Service Medal (Australia)
University of Melbourne alumni
University of Melbourne women
Living people
Year of birth missing (living people)